The spot-crowned woodcreeper (Lepidocolaptes affinis), is a passerine bird which breeds in the tropical New World from the Sierra Madre Oriental of eastern Mexico to northern Panama.

Description
It has a spotted crown, olive brown upperparts with fine streaking on the upper back, a chestnut rump, wings and tail, and heavily streaked olive-brown underparts. The bill is slender and decurved. Young birds are duller with less distinct streaking and crown spots. The call is a squeaky deeik and the song is a trill and rattle deeeeeeah hihihihihi.

The spot-crowned woodcreeper is very similar to streak-headed woodcreeper, Lepidocolaptes souleyetii, but is larger, has a spotted crown, and is the only woodcreeper found at high altitudes.

Distribution and habitat
This woodcreeper is found in mountains from 1000 m to the timberline in mossy, epiphyte-laden forest and adjacent semi-open woodland and clearings.

Behaviour
It builds a leaf-lined nest  up in a tree cavity or old woodpecker or barbet hole, and lays two white eggs.

It feeds on spiders and insects, creeping up trunks and extracting its prey from the bark or mosses. It will join mixed-species feeding flocks.

References

Further reading

External links
Stamps (for El Salvador) with range map
Photo gallery - VIREO

spot-crowned woodcreeper
Birds of Mexico
Birds of the Sierra Madre Oriental
Birds of the Sierra Madre del Sur
Birds of Central America
Birds of Guatemala
Birds of El Salvador
Birds of Honduras
Birds of Costa Rica
spot-crowned woodcreeper
Birds of the Talamancan montane forests
Fauna of Los Tuxtlas